Charles Dalmas (11 March 1863 – 18 October 1938) was a French architect who mainly worked in Nice, in the south of France.

Life

Charles Dalmas was born in Nice on 11 March 1863, one of six children of a shoemaker and a seamstress.
He attended the Nice School of Decorative Arts, where he was recognized as a gifted student.
In August 1886 he was admitted as an architecture student at the École nationale supérieure des Beaux-Arts in Paris, the only school in France that issued a diploma of architecture.
The city of Nice helped fund his studies in 1888.
He won various prizes including the Müller-Soehnée prize of 539 francs for deserving students.
In the 1890-91 term he was unable to complete the two projects required of each student due to health problems and a period of military service, and was therefore dismissed from the school.
On appeal he was readmitted, and graduated on 23 December 1891 with a project for a city hall for Nice.
He continued to study at ENSBA until March 1893.

Charles Dalmas returned permanently to Nice in 1897, and became professor of building technology at the Nice School of Decorative Arts.
His architecture practice flourished, and on 25 May 1919 he was named president of the Association of Architects of the South East.
His son, Marcel Dalmas (1892–1950), collaborated with Charles Dalmas in the 1920s and 1930s.
Charles and Marcel Dalmas received a Grand Prix at the Paris International Decorative and Industrial Arts Exhibition in 1925 for the Alpes Maritimes pavilion.
Their design was a "modest dwelling of an Art Lover in the Alpes-Maritimes".
Charles and Marcel Dalmas were both lovers of tennis. 
They built a new facility for the Lawn-Tennis Club de Nice in the 1920s, choosing a regional style and materials.
Charles Dalmas was named knight of the Legion of Honour in 1928.

Charles and Marcel Dalmas collaborated with the architect and engineer François Alexandre Arluc in construction of the Miramar Hotel in Cannes in 1928.
That year Charles and Marcel Dalmas built the Art Deco Palais de la Méditerranée casino on the Promenade des Anglais, Nice.
Most of the casino was demolished in May 1990 apart from two of the facades, replaced by a resort with conference facilities, recreation areas, residences and offices.
Marcel-Victor Guilgot was associated with Charles and Marcel Dalmas from 1931 to 1937.
Charles Dalmas died at his home in Nice on 18 October 1938 at the age of 75.

Noted works

In Cimiez

Hotels

Other buildings

Modifications of Facades

Notes

Sources

1863 births
1938 deaths
People from Nice
École des Beaux-Arts alumni
19th-century French architects
20th-century French architects